Juvenile justice usually refers to a system that uses juvenile courts, also known as youth courts or children's courts. It may also refer to:

Juvenile Justice (TV series), a  2022 South Korean TV series
New South Wales Department of Juvenile Justice, a former government department in New South Wales, Australia
The punishment of young people in youth detention centers, also known as juvenile detention
Juvenile detention in the Northern Territory

See also

Age of criminal responsibility
Children's Court Clinic, New South Wales, Australia
Children's Court of New South Wales, Australia
Children's Court of Queensland, Australia
Children's Court of Victoria, Australia
Children's Court of Western Australia
Juvenile court
Juvenile delinquency
Minor (law)
Teen court, aka youth court or peer court
Young offender
Youth Court of New Zealand
Youth justice (disambiguation)
Youth Koori Court